Mejbil  is a village located in the Alipurduar district of West Bengal in India. Politically, it is represented by the  Alipurduar I constituency. It is situated between the Falakata-Sonapur NH31D highway. Falakata is the nearest town to Mejbil. The administrative works are done at Alipurduar.

Education 
There are no higher secondary schools in Mejbil. However, the village has five primary schools and two Shishu Shiksha Kendra(pre-schools).

Culture
Mejbil is a culturally significant area. Bhawaiya in particular is a vibrant form of culture within Mejbil. Rashmela is the largest festival held in Mejbil. In 2019, the festival of Rashmela has completed its 50th anniversary. In addition, Mejbil has a wide variety of folk cultures such as Kushan Jatra, Bishahara, Jatra, et al.

Sports
Football and cricket are the most popular sports in Mejbil. The main playground for these sports is called Mejbil Rashmela Maidan. The two major sports and cultural clubs in Mejbil are called Kranti Sangha and Pally Kalyan Sangha.

References

Villages in Alipurduar district